Bharat Popli (born 30 May 1990) is an Indian-born New Zealand first-class cricketer who plays for Northern Districts. He scored the most runs in the 2015–16 Plunket Shield season, with a total of 1,149. He made his List A debut for Northern Districts on 22 January 2017 in the 2016–17 Ford Trophy. In June 2018, he was awarded a contract with Northern Districts for the 2018–19 season.

References

External links
 
 

1990 births
Living people
New Zealand cricketers
Northern Districts cricketers
People from New Delhi
Indian emigrants to New Zealand
New Zealand sportspeople of Indian descent